Love in E-Flat is a 1967 comedy play by Norman Krasna.

Plot
Teacher Amy is having an affair with intern Howard. He is jealous of her and bugs her apartment with a listening attack.

Original production
In August 1966 it was announced the production would be produced  by Alfred de Liagre. The producer said he selected it over 500 other plays and liked that it was not concerned with the theatre of the absurd, the theatre of cruelty or theatre of sexual deviation. The following month George Seaton signed to direct; it was Seaton's first show for the legitimate theatre.

By November Hal Buckley and Kathleen Nolan were cast. 

It opened February 13, 1967. "It's mild" said Walter Kerr of the New York Times. "It's full of mild people... it's very discrete about its jokes... polite, professional, placid."

The play closed March 4, 1967 after 24 performances.

Later productions
The play went to Los Angeles in 1969.

Elke Sommer appeared in a 1972 production in Chicago.

The Los Angeles Times called a 1975 production "pleasant, rather bland."

Film adaptation
In September 1970 Lawrence Kasha bought the film rights and hired Krasna to write a script. However no movie resulted.

References

External links
 
  (archive)

1967 plays
Plays by Norman Krasna
Broadway plays
Plays set in New York City